Walter L. Houser (May 6, 1855–April 7, 1928) was a politician from the U.S. state of Wisconsin. He served as that state's seventeenth Secretary of State of Wisconsin, serving two terms from January 5, 1903 to January 7, 1907. He was a Republican and served under governors Robert La Follette, Sr. and James O. Davidson.

He resided in Mondovi, Wisconsin at the time of his election, where he also served as mayor.

Notes

References 

Secretaries of State of Wisconsin
Mayors of places in Wisconsin
1855 births
1928 deaths
Wisconsin Republicans
People from Mondovi, Wisconsin